St. Luke's Theatre was a 174-seat Off-Broadway theatre at St. Luke's Lutheran Church at 308 West 46th Street, on Restaurant Row, just west of Eighth Avenue in Manhattan's Theater District.

Created by then-Pastor Dale Hansen, St. Luke's Theatre came about with the revitalization of Times Square and Restaurant Row. The theatre began operating in the mid 1990s and featured such early hits like Late Night Catechism, starring Maripat Donovan.

The theatre is owned by Saint Luke's Lutheran Church and was managed by Entertainment Events in the late 1990s, then by West End Artists from 2006-2020.

In March 2020, the theatre was forced to close due to the COVID-19 pandemic. The church parted ways with the management company, refurbished the space, and created a new non-profit theatre company called Playhouse 46 at St. Lukes, which reopened on April 14, 2022 with its first show, Islander, A New Musical.

External links 

Off-Broadway theaters
Hell's Kitchen, Manhattan